BR-050 is a federal highway of Brazil. The 1025.3 kilometre road connects Brasília to Santos. Inside of São Paulo, the highway also receives the designation of Rodovia Anhanguera (SP-330).

Economic importance 
The BR-050 is undoubtedly one of the most important highways in the country. Being close to being fully duplicated in 2021, it passes through some of the richest regions of Brazil. It links areas of large agricultural and industrial production to Port of Santos, the largest in the country. Brasília is the city with the highest average salary per inhabitant. Goiás is one of the largest national producers of sugarcane, soy, corn and tomatoes, in addition to having a large cattle ranching. The area between Uberaba and Uberlândia, in Minas Gerais, has the largest milk production in Brazil. The state of São Paulo holds 30% of Brazil's industrial GDP and a gigantic agricultural sector. In Ribeirão Preto there is the largest production of sugarcane in the world. In Franca, there is the largest national production of men's shoes. The highway also drains the gigantic production of coffee from Minas Gerais and orange juice from São Paulo. In the area around Campinas there is a great technological production. 40% of the cars produced in the country come from the cities of Greater São Paulo. Not to mention the production of chicken meat and all industrial production in São Paulo, which is basically exported via Santos.

Duplication 
The highway doubles from Santos, passing, among others, through the cities of São Paulo, Campinas, Ribeirão Preto, Uberaba, Uberlândia and Araguari, to the bridge over the Paranaíba river, on the border with the state of Goiás.

In the state of Goiás, the section between Catalão and Cristalina, which has 183 km, is in the process of being dualled, with 176 km completed.

Gallery

References

Federal highways in Brazil